Tabanus fulvulus is a horse fly in the subfamily Tabaninae ("horse flies"), in the order Diptera ("flies").

Distribution
United States.

References

Tabanidae
Insects described in 1828
Taxa named by Christian Rudolph Wilhelm Wiedemann
Diptera of North America